The 2011 Epping Forest District Council election was held on 5 May 2011 to elect members of Epping Forest Council in England as part of the wider local elections in England and Northern Ireland.

One-third of the seats were up for election. No vote was held in Buckhurst Hill East, Chigwell Row, Chigwell Village, High Ongar, Willingale and The Rodings, the Loughton wards, Moreton and Fyfield, Passingford or Theydon Bois.

Results

Broadley Common, Epping Upland and Nazeing

Buckhurst Hill West

Chipping Ongar, Greensted and Marden Ash

Epping Hemnall

Epping Lindsey and Thornwood Common

Grange Hill

Hastingwood, Matching and Sheering Village

Lambourne

Lower Nazeing

Lower Sheering

North Weald Bassett

Roydon

Shelley

Waltham Abbey High Beech

Waltham Abbey Honey Lane

Waltham Abbey North East

Waltham Abbey Paternoster

Waltham Abbey South West

References

Epping Forest
Epping Forest District Council elections
2010s in Essex